Ethiopia–Serbia relations are bilateral ties between Ethiopia and Serbia. Since the time of Yugoslavia, relations between the two nations have been warm. Both Ethiopia and Serbia are majority Eastern Christian nations. Ethiopia is one of Serbia's strongest advocates in Africa when it comes to their position on the recognition of Kosovo.

History

Ethiopia–Yugoslavia relations

The former state of Yugoslavia maintained diplomatic ties with Ethiopia and shared membership of the NAM bloc. Josip Broz Tito granted Haile Selassie I the title of honorary citizen of the city of Belgrade. The first vessel of the Ethiopian Navy was a gift from Yugoslavia, and as a sign of thanks Marshal Tito was given a villa in Addis Ababa which is now the Serbian Embassy.

Contemporary relations
On January 27, 2012, after travelling to Addis Ababa in order to reaffirm Ethiopia's stance on Kosovo regarding Serbia, Vuk Jeremić and Haile Mariam signed a memorandum of understanding between the two nations' ministries of foreign affairs.

Trade
In March 2011, as a result of a meeting between Serbian tractor manufacturer Industrija Motora Rakovica announced it would begin exporting tractor frames and motors to Ethiopia for assembly. The first of the partially assembled tractors from Rakovica arrived in Ethiopia in May 2011.

External links 
  Serbian Ministry of Foreign Affairs about relations with Algeria
  Serbian Ministry of Foreign Affairs: direction of the Serbian embassy in Adis Abeba
  Serbian Ministry of Foreign Affairs: direction of the Ethiopian embassy in Rome

See also 
 Yugoslavia and the Non-Aligned Movement
 Yugoslavia and the Organisation of African Unity

References 

 

 
Serbia
Bilateral relations of Serbia